Toad, known in Japan as  is a fictional character who primarily appears in Nintendo's Mario franchise. A humanoid with a mushroom-like head, Toad was created by Japanese video game designer Shigeru Miyamoto, and is portrayed as a citizen of the Mushroom Kingdom and is one of Princess Peach's most loyal attendants, constantly working on her behalf. They are usually seen as a non-player character who provides assistance to Mario and his friends in most games, but there are times when Toad takes center stage and appears as a protagonist, as seen in Super Mario Bros. 2, Wario's Woods and Super Mario 3D World.

While Toad is the name of an individual, it also refers to their entire race (much like Yoshi and Birdo). However, in early games, the species was called Mushroom Retainers, in Japan they were called , literally "Mushroom People" (which is an alternate name used in earlier localizations, along with "Mushroom Retainers"). In the Mario franchise, there are also some other individual Toad characters (e.g., Toadette, Toadsworth, Toadbert, and Captain Toad). The most prominent trait of a Toad is its large head that resembles a mushroom in shape and color – historically speculated as them wearing a mushroom hat, as portrayed in The Super Mario Bros. Super Show!, but eventually ruled out by Super Mario Odyssey director Yoshiaki Koizumi. Another common point of most Toads is their traditional vest.

The Toads usually play assisting roles in the Mario franchise and its action games, such as Toadsworth introduced in Super Mario Sunshine and the Toad Brigade association in Super Mario Galaxy and Super Mario Galaxy 2 (they have not made a main game appearance since). Despite this, Toads also play the role as heroes in some games. Such a case included the 2 Toads (yellow and blue) who were featured as playable characters along with Mario and Luigi in New Super Mario Bros. Wii. The 2 Toads (yellow and blue) return as playable characters later on in New Super Mario Bros. U as well as New Super Luigi U. Toad himself (in a blue palette in reference to his original sprite from Super Mario Bros. 2) returns as one of the playable characters in Super Mario 3D World. Captain Toad: Treasure Tracker cast Captain Toad into the spotlight, thus marking it as the first game in 20 years (since Wario's Woods) to have a Toad as the star of a game, as well as the first game to have Toad as the titular character.

Concept and creation
Toad and the mushroom people were first seen in the game Super Mario Bros. where the species was revealed to comprise the majority of the population of the Mushroom Kingdom. Toad's design was made directly from the power-up, the Super Mushroom, as well as the game's general association with mushrooms. Shigeru Miyamoto, the creator of the Mario franchise, reasons that Toad's creation was that of being a character that has a simplistic design; yet, still appears cute and lovely and pleasing to everybody. In the game, the peaceful Toads of the Mushroom Kingdom had been turned into various objects such as bricks and pipes by the evil King Bowser; however, some of Princess Toadstool's loyal servants, known as the "Mushroom Retainers," were simply kidnapped.

During the development of New Super Mario Bros. Wii, the developers at Nintendo decided between four characters to be playable in the game: Princess Peach, Toad, Wario and Waluigi (all suggestions made by fans). Two Toads (yellow and blue) were eventually included as playable characters in New Super Mario Bros. Wii due to their physical similarity to Mario and Luigi.

Toad's English name appears to have been inspired by the word "toadstool", a word used to describe mushrooms, including those featuring umbrella-like cap-and-stem form characteristics, which Toad's design portrays along with the character's general resemblance to a mushroom. Toad's Japanese name, "Kinopio", appears to be a combination of the Japanese word for mushroom ("kinoko") and the Japanese name for Carlo Collodi's character, Pinocchio ("Pinokio"), which both roughly blend together to form the meaning of "a real mushroom boy" (as evidenced through Pinocchio's dream to become a real boy in his own tale).

Characteristics

Though Toad's signature mushroom cap is a hat in the non-canon Mario cartoons, Super Mario Odyssey producer Yoshiaki Koizumi confirmed that since the creation of the character in 1985, the cap was intended to be part of his head.

During an interview in 2014, Nintendo director Koichi Hayashida who produced the game Captain Toad: Treasure Tracker, revealed that the appearance of a Toad does not represent his gender, explaining it has never been decided what gender could be associated with any Toad. He clarifies later that the gender of the Toads will remain a mystery.

Toad bears a similar appearance to the rest of his species with his large mushroom caps and clothes. He is very small in size, and has no legs visible, with just his typical brown shoes showing. Unlike other Toads, he features five red spots on his mushroom cap and wears a blue and yellow vest; however, his coloration will change if he gets a fire flower, as his cap's colors will be reversed while his clothes turn red. A yellow outline was added to his vest in the recent Mario games, starting with Super Mario Sunshine. Sometimes, Toad appears with a red vest, though he is most often seen with his blue vest. In the non-canonical Mario cartoons, Toad has on occasion removed his mushroom cap, revealing three strands of hair. Toad is also seen with pants of a white color that resemble the base of a mushroom or toadstool stalk.

At most times, Toad is portrayed as timid and cowardly. Despite his fears, in many games such as Super Mario 64, he is helpful to Mario and his crew on their search for Peach, supporting him on his adventures, from providing items to adventuring alongside the hero on his quest. Although he is usually seen as a cheerful character, he can become distressed when a major event occurs, such as the kidnapping of Princess Peach.

Toad demonstrates a strong loyalty to his Princess and friends and is depicted as hard working. In Luigi's Mansion, he is seen crying in certain places because he cares so much about Mario getting kidnapped by ghosts and fears he could get captured too. He was sent by Princess Peach to the mansion to look for Mario. In Luigi's Mansion: Dark Moon, five colored Toads are trapped in paintings by King Boo.

Abilities
Through the various games that Toad is playable in, he has been shown with different unique abilities that differ from the other characters in the series. In Super Mario Bros. 2, the game describes him as being the strongest and fastest character in the game with 5 out of 5 stars each, but with a weak jumping ability, rated at 2 stars. In Wario's Woods, Toad has the unique ability to run up walls and make strong kicks. Toad is once again given superhuman strength in the game, as he is able to lift and throw enemies around; however, these abilities have not been seen since this game. In New Super Mario Bros. Wii, Toad shares many of the moves and abilities of Mario and Luigi, such as the ground pound and wall jumping as represented by the yellow and blue Toads. Toad has access to Mario's power ups, but unlike the other games Toad has starred in, this game gives him all-round stats similar to those of the Mario Bros. In Super Mario 3D World, Toad is again the fastest playable character; however, his weakness includes his weaker jumps in comparison to the other playable characters.

In the Super Smash Bros. series, Toad is shown to emit spores like a real mushroom whenever he is attacked, as shown when Peach uses her standard special move. However, this has never been seen in the main Mario series games. Toad exhibits a similar technique in Mario Sports Mix where he is capable of using the spores to cause mushrooms to sprout from the ground, and his special move is also based on this skill. He is also capable of using these emitted spores as a shield against various attacks in this game.

Appearances

Toad and his race of mushroom people made their debut appearance in Super Mario Bros. where they play a minimal role in the game. They appear at the end of every world as the Mushroom Retainers (who serve the princess) once Mario or Luigi defeats Bowser, rewarding the heroes with the message: "Thank you Mario! But our princess is in another castle!", and in the Japanese Super Mario Bros. 2 they maintain this role. In the American Super Mario Bros. 2, Toad got his first individual appearance and was given a bigger role as one of the four playable characters. In Super Mario Bros. 3, Toad appears in the Toad houses where he provides items and extra lives for Mario to take on his journey. He is the sole playable character in the puzzle game Wario's Woods, where he tries to prevent Wario from taking over the woods with the help of Birdo and a fairy named Wanda.

The 3D Mario games introduced Toad's role as a helper who would provide assistance to Mario if he needed it, thus making him a major allies. In Super Mario 64, Toad explains the backstory as well as explaining what Mario has to do to proceed. In the remake Super Mario 64 DS, he is given character-specific remarks, such as mistaking Luigi for Mario in green clothes or thinking that Wario would betray the rest of the group. In Luigi's Mansion, he appears in various parts of the mansion as a save point. Different colored Toads appear in Super Mario Sunshine as Peach's attendants. In Super Mario Galaxy, Toads appear in the beginning as citizens of Toad Town. Toad appears in the introduction, holding hands with Toadette as the two look at the night sky.

In New Super Mario Bros. Wii and  U, there are two playable Toads (multi-player only), one blue and one yellow. The blue Toad has a similar appearance to the original Toad and shares the same voices as Toad in New Super Mario Bros. Wii. The yellow Toad has a higher pitched voice. Red spotted Toads are non-playable hosts of Toad houses and are strewn throughout levels that Mario must bring to the finish to save.

Toad plays a role in the 2011 3DS title Super Mario 3D Land in which he, upon his rescue at the end of World One, assists Mario throughout the rest of the adventure through the availability of Toad Houses, where he provides items and uncovering secrets in various levels. Toad appears as a prominent character in New Super Mario Bros. 2 again running the Toad Houses to assist both Mario and Luigi. In Super Mario 3D World, a blue Toad is a playable character.

In Luigi's Mansion: Dark Moon, Toad and four others (yellow, blue, green and purple) act as assistants to Professor E. Gadd, who had sent them to investigate the mansions before Luigi had arrived. Throughout the game, Luigi meets up with the Toads, who help him uncover secrets in the mansions.

Throughout the Mario RPG series, Toad is featured as more of a minor character due to the large amounts of generic Toads which appear in the games who seem to replace his role as a helper. In the times he does appear, Toad is once again a minor character who provides backstory to Mario and the others. In Super Mario RPG, he appears as a major NPC character who teaches Mario about the different skills to use in battles in the beginning as the duo heads to the Mushroom Kingdom (though Toad had to be saved by Mario along the way as he is kidnapped frequently by enemies). He appears more throughout the game, for example as part of Mario's nightmare. Toad appears as a playable character in Mario & Luigi: Superstar Saga for a short time when the player is exploring around Mario and Luigi's house. In Super Princess Peach, Toad is kidnapped earlier in the game along with Mario and Luigi by the Hammer Bros. However, Toad appears as a playable character in two of the minigames in the game. Toad appears in Super Paper Mario in 3 aspects of the game. He appears in the intro, telling Mario and Luigi that Princess Peach has been kidnapped, and later appears in the Arcade mini-game Mansion Patrol. Additionally, Toad is one of the 256 Catch Cards in the game. In Mario & Luigi: Bowser's Inside Story, a mysterious infection called "The Blorbs" causes the Toads to inflate to many times their normal size and roll around uncontrollably. Recent games in the Paper Mario series, starting from Paper Mario: Sticker Star in 2012, have prominently featured Toads as the most common non-playable character (NPC) that Mario can interact with. This is due to the fact that Nintendo's intellectual property (IP) team refrains them from creating new characters that could possibly interfere with the Mario universe.

Captain Toad

  is a Toad that serves as the leader of the Toad Brigade, a group of Toad explorers. In an interview with Polygon, Captain Toad: Treasure Tracker director Shinya Hiratake said "I think honestly Captain Toad is someone that doesn’t really care what’s going on, but when he sees treasure he’s like, ‘I want it!’". He is described by IGN as an "unlikely protagonist who's weighed down by a heavy backpack and a desire for treasure".

He first appeared in Super Mario Galaxy, where he helped Mario or Luigi retrieve Power Stars. Captain Toad also appeared in the game's sequel, Super Mario Galaxy 2, with his brigade to again help Mario retrieve the Power Stars in order to save Princess Peach.

In Super Mario 3D World, Captain Toad appears in his own levels "The Adventures of Captain Toad" separate from the main playable characters. In "The Adventures of Captain Toad", Captain Toad must collect five Green Stars without jumping, and two hits will result in a life loss, but he can use his headlight to destroy any ghosts in his levels.

Captain Toad later starred in Captain Toad: Treasure Tracker, a year after Super Mario 3D World was released.

A Mystery Mushroom costume based on Captain Toad from Captain Toad: Treasure Tracker was made available through an update to Super Mario Maker. Captain Toad appears in all but three of Super Mario Odyssey's Kingdoms, rewarding the player with a Power Moon after they find him in each location.

When reviewing Treasure Tracker, IGN's Marty Sliva called Captain Toad and Toadette "a pair of sweet, endearing characters that [they] genuinely wanted to root for", saying that personality details like Captain Toad and Toadette "cower[ing] in fear when they see a ghost, add a nice dollop of charm to the whole package".

Other appearances
 
Toad has appeared in many of the various Mario spin-off games. In the Mario Kart series, of which he has appeared in every installment, Toad is usually featured as a lightweight driver with good acceleration to compensate for his speed. His partner Toadette was created for Mario Kart: Double Dash and together they shared a special item, the Super Mushroom, which allowed them to take multiple boosts for a short while. The item reappears in later Mario Kart games, but is renamed the Golden Mushroom. Toadette, who has appeared in other spin-off games since her first appearance, was stated to be Toad's sister in an official Prima strategy guide for Mario Kart Wii (though this relationship between Toad and Toadette has yet to be confirmed by Nintendo itself). He appears in his own tournament for Mario Kart Wii, where the player goes through Mushroom Gorge backwards using Toad as their character. Toad even receives his own tracks throughout the installments such as his own circuit (named after himself) in Mario Kart 7. He appears in every Mario Party game; however, it is only from Mario Party 5 and on that he is playable (excluding Mario Party Advance), as he was a host for the earlier games in the series and Super Mario Party, and even a damsel in distress character for Mario Party 2 after several Baby Bowsers abduct him. Toad appears in the various Mario sports games. In Mario Superstar Baseball, Toad appears as a team member whose chemistry refers to his background; for example, he has good chemistry with Princess Peach and Toadette but bad chemistry with Wario. Toad also appears in the sequel, Mario Super Sluggers, again as a team member along with other differently colored toads. He also appears as a team member with good techniques in Mario Strikers and he also appears in its sequel Mario Strikers Charged with the same role. His sidekick role is retained in Dance Dance Revolution: Mario Mix, where he accompanies either Mario or Luigi to help get back the musical keys from the villains of the game. Mini Toads (toy versions of Toad) are included as playable characters throughout the Mario vs. Donkey Kong series, starting with Mario vs. Donkey Kong 2: March of the Minis. Mini Toads make a returning appearance in the 2010 release of Mario vs. Donkey Kong: Mini-Land Mayhem! as playable characters who assist Mario on his journey to rescue his friend Pauline from the clutches of Donkey Kong. Toad makes appearances in Super Mario Maker. A Mystery Mushroom costume based on Toad can be unlocked, and Toad appears at the end of the 10-Mario challenge and the easy mode of the 100-Mario challenge, saying that Princess Peach has been taken to another castle (kind of like what happened in Super Mario Bros.). In Super Mario Run, Toad is one of six playable characters and it can be unlocked by connecting a My Nintendo account. In addition, he is the referee of Toad Rally if players use Toadette.

In Mario & Sonic at the Olympic Games he is a referee along with Cream the Rabbit, a Lakitu, and other Mario and Sonic characters. In its sequel, Mario & Sonic at the Olympic Winter Games, Toad appears in the adventure mode and as well as a host. In Mario & Sonic at the London 2012 Olympic Games, Toad resumes his role as one of the main hosts; however, he plays a much larger role as a main protagonist within the story mode in the 3DS version of the game. He appears in Super Smash Bros. Melee, Super Smash Bros. Brawl, Super Smash Bros. for Nintendo 3DS / Wii U and Super Smash Bros. Ultimate as a sticker, trophy, spirit, and a counter-attack for Peach and Daisy.

In Kirby Super Star and Ultra, Toad appears as an audience member in the Megaton Punch minigame along with Mario, Luigi and Birdo. He also appears in Dedede Stadium along with Mario, Luigi, Wario and Peach. Toad appears as a main protagonist in the Game & Watch masterpieces in the Game & Watch Gallery series as well. Toad appears as one of the 11 Mario series characters that are playable in the Japan only game, Itadaki Street DS which was developed by Square-Enix. Toad is also playable in the international release of the Wii sequel Fortune Street. Toad had also appeared as a playable character in the Japanese Satellaview game Mario Excite Bike. Toad makes a playable appearance in the Nintendo Wii game Mario Sports Mix, and is classified as a speedy character in this game.

Appearances in other media
Toad appeared in the animated series The Super Mario Bros. Super Show! produced by DIC Entertainment in 1989. Although he usually tagged along with Mario and Luigi in cases where King Koopa had kidnapped Princess Peach, he sometimes got captured as well. Toad's role in the show was to be the 3rd main character to the Mario Bros. (as Luigi was also a major character rather than a sidekick). He remained on the show when it spun off into The Adventures of Super Mario Bros. 3, allowing them to live in his house. During the show he got alternate forms such as The Toad Warrior, Baby Toad and even Fire Toad; however, these forms of Toad have not made an appearance outside of the show. Due to his & many other characters’ absences in the Super Mario World game, Toad did not make an appearance in the TV show of Super Mario World with Yoshi and Oogtar (the latter having the same voice actor as Toad) instead taking his place. Toad appeared in the Super Mario Bros. comic books published by Valiant as well. In these comics, Toad often followed Mario on his adventures, seemingly as the hero's sidekick. He was a regular companion for King Toadstool, and even indulged in the King's activities. Played by Mojo Nixon, Toad appeared as a street musician in the non-canon Super Mario Bros. film. In the film, Toad is arrested for singing a song that badmouths Koopa, who punishes him by having him turned into a Goomba. Despite this, the Goomba-fied Toad (portrayed by John Fifer) remains hating Koopa and still manages to help Princess Daisy escape and distract the other Goombas by playing his harmonica.

Toad also makes a cameo appearance in the Wii U version of Scribblenauts Unlimited, as a guest character from Nintendo's Super Mario series. A costume of Toad is also one of the exclusive Nintendo character costumes available to be equipped to various characters in the Wii U version of Tekken Tag Tournament 2.

Toad will be voiced by Keegan-Michael Key in the upcoming 2023 film adaptation.

Promotion and reception
As a character who appears frequently in the series, Toad is considered to be one of the major characters in the Mario franchise .
He has appeared in much of the Mario merchandise in products ranging from toys to plushies and keychains, and is featured in Nintendo's board games such as being on the protagonist side in a Mario themed chess set and being a purchasable character in a Nintendo-themed monopoly game. In Animal Crossing: City Folk, Toad's hat is available after getting 3000 points in Tom Nook's Point Tracking system. The American Club Nintendo website, which is now closed, offered a special reward featuring Toad and some other major Mario characters in a folder set reward named as the "Toad & Friends Set with Bookmarks". The quote repeated by the Toads in Super Mario Bros., "Thank you Mario! But our princess is in another castle!", was ranked one of the most repeated video game quotes, and inspired a 2008 song by The Mountain Goats and Kaki King.

Toad ranked in the seventh slot on GameDaily's top 10 Nintendo characters that deserve their own games list; the site explained that he has a strong appeal that Nintendo has yet to tap into. Toad is listed in The Most Neglected Mario Bros. Characters list as a character whom Nintendo has ignored for quite a while due to his lack of starring roles in more recent games. IGN also listed Toad as one of the top ten characters needing a spin-off. In an Oricon poll conducted in Japan from 2008, Toad was voted as the eighth most popular video game character in Japan. Another poll (of over 1000 votes) conducted in Japan by NintendoWorldReport in concern to Japan's favorite Mario Kart racers listed Toad as the second most favorite Mario Kart racer in the country (only being beaten by Yoshi). Toad has been credited for being one of the celebrated characters in the twenty-fifth anniversary of the Super Mario Bros. games. MTV, when commenting on the wackiness of Super Mario 2 (Super Mario Bros. 2), called Toad "so awesome". UGO.com listed Toad on their list of "The Cutest Video Game Characters," stating "Once you get over his misleading name, you’ll find Toad to be quite the adorable mushroom."

IGN editor Matt Casamassina criticized Nintendo for including the two generic Toads over more notable characters (including the red-spotted Toad himself) in the Mario series for New Super Mario Bros. Wii, arguing that the developers were being lazy to not include other characters because the Toads were easier to make. Toads in the Paper Mario series following the release of Paper Mario: Sticker Star have been heavily criticized for lacking their diverse characteristics found in previous entries and for replacing the cast of original fictional races the series previously had, with Giant Bomb's Dan Ryckert lamenting "Previous Paper Mario games have featured a wide variety of NPCs, complete with tons of different looks and personalities. In Color Splash, it's just a bunch of Toads of different colors".

See also
Slime (Dragon Quest)
Chao (Sonic) – Similar "default" characters in the Sonic franchise

Notes

References

External links
Toad on Super Mario Wiki
Toad (species) on Super Mario Wiki

Anthropomorphic video game characters
Fantasy film characters
Fictional fungi
Fictional humanoids
Fictional male sportspeople
Male characters in video games
Mario (franchise) characters
Nintendo protagonists
Video game characters introduced in 1985
Video game sidekicks
Video game species and races